The 2017–18 St. John's Red Storm men's basketball team represented St. John's University during the 2017–18 NCAA Division I men's basketball season. They were coached by alumnus and Naismith Memorial Basketball Hall of Fame member Chris Mullin, in his third year at the school. They played their home games at Carnesecca Arena and Madison Square Garden as members of the Big East Conference. They finished the season 16–17, 4–14 in Big East play to finish in tie for ninth place. They beat Georgetown in the first round of the Big East tournament before losing to Xavier in the quarterfinals.

Previous season
The Red Storm finished the 2016–17 season with a record of 14–19, 7–11 in Big East play to finish in eighth place in conference. They defeated Georgetown in the first round of the Big East tournament before losing to Villanova in the quarterfinals.

Offseason

Departures

Incoming transfers

2017 recruiting class

2018 recruiting class

Preseason 
In a preseason poll of Big East coaches, the Red Storm was picked to finish in sixth place in the Big East. Sophomore guards Marcus LoVett and Shamorie Ponds were named to the preseason All-Big East second team.

Roster

Schedule and results

|-
!colspan=9 style=| Exhibition

|-
!colspan=9 style=| Regular season

|-
!colspan=9 style=|Big East tournament

References

St. John's Red Storm men's basketball seasons
St. John's
Saint John's
Saint John's